Nathan Wyburn (born 24 October 1989) is a Welsh variety act artist and media personality who has created celebrity portraits (iconography) and pop culture imagery using non-traditional media such as foodstuffs and other household items, most notably working with Marmite on toast. He has personally created works of art for Prince William & Kate Middleton, His Majesty The King Charles 3rd, Mariah Carey, Dame Shirley Bassey, Catherine Zeta-Jones and The Jacksons.

Wyburn has also been a finalist on Britain's Got Talent and on Austria's Die große Chance, and has featured on shows such as ITV's magazine show This Morning and SKY Arts Landmark, where he represented Wales.

Biography

Early years
Wyburn is from Ebbw Vale, South Wales and studied Art at both GCSE and A-level. After leaving school he undertook a degree in Fine Art at Cardiff School of Art & Design.

In 2010 he posted a YouTube video of himself creating a portrait of TV personality Simon Cowell, made using Marmite on toast. Alongside other time lapse videos Wyburn has gained in excess of 10 million video views. He was featured on the BBC children's TV programme, Blue Peter. He subsequently featured on other TV shows, including ITV News and Sky Sports, where he created a portrait of England football manager Fabio Capello using bolognese sauce and pasta. He received messages of support from celebrities including singer Katherine Jenkins and pop star Justin Bieber.

Britain's Got Talent
In 2011 Wyburn appeared as a contestant on the TV talent show Britain's Got Talent, where he created a portrait of judge Michael McIntyre, again using Marmite on toast. He reached the semi-finals where he attempted elaborate portraits of Michael Jackson, Marilyn Monroe and Elvis Presley, but failed to live up to expectations, with the judges telling him he had taken on too much in the short time available. This also led to other television appearances such as Daybreak and Lorraine. He later decided to create an image of Queen Elizabeth II, as he had missed out on the prize to meet her.

2012–2014
In 2012, at the height of the News International phone hacking scandal, Wyburn's portrait of Rupert Murdoch, made from 5,000 images of alleged phone-hacking victims, appeared on the front page of The Guardian. Wyburn's work was also recognized as part of the London 2012 Olympic Games under Education Relays when he held a one-off edible art exhibition, featuring British Olympians at Bournemouth Arts College and quoted "Amazing" by Diver Tom Daley. In 2013 he entered the Austrian equivalent talent contest, Die große Chance, finishing in the last fifteen and gaining praise from Eurovision winner Conchita Wurst after creating her portrait using glitter. 
Other international projects for Wyburn include creating toothpaste art at the '15th International Dental Congress' in Istanbul and a 10-day stint in a purpose-built glass container in the centre of Helsinki, where he created over 50 portraits of Felix Ketchup fans using the product, boosting sales by 18%. Wyburn continued to have TV appearances including a performance on the Spanish version of Don't Stop Me Now and as Sky Portrait Artist of the Year.

Shortly after the death of Margaret Thatcher, Wyburn created a portrait of her using coal. The artwork won 1st prize in a nationwide open art competition entitled Britain's Got Artists judged by George Galloway.

Commercial commissions
Brands such as Marmite, Bic, the Famous Company, Oral-B, Costa, Starbucks, Morrisons and Hovis have independently commissioned Wyburn. Wyburn's work has received plaudits from a number of celebrity admirers including Perez Hilton, Stephen Fry, Ruby Rose, Tyler Oakley, Joanna Lumley, Keith Lemon and Alan Carr.

From 1 August to 21 September 2014 Wyburn exhibited at the Cardiff Story Museum. Previous exhibitions include Barnabas Arts House and Queens Arcade, Cardiff.

In May 2015 Wyburn created a portrait of Princess Charlotte of Cambridge, the infant daughter of Prince William, Duke of Cambridge, using 1,000 babygrows. In May 2015 he also created a portrait of Welsh rugby international Adam Jones using mud.

For Father's Day 2015 Wyburn teamed up with Morrison's supermarket to create pizzas featuring five famous fathers: David Beckham, Tom Fletcher, Gary Barlow Simon Cowell and Marvin Humes. Other notable works by Wyburn include Miley Cyrus painted entirely with his tongue, David Beckham painted with his feet, Jesus Christ using chocolate and Lady Gaga using Coca-Cola.

Wyburn had pinned his success on his self-confessed "Warhol like obsession" with pop culture and the notion of celebrity. His biggest artistic influences are Andy Warhol, Chuck Close and Vik Muniz. In a September 2015 interview with the BBC, Wyburn said of his own work: "It is current to current affairs and current to pop culture. I don't see why that should not be shown in a gallery, in the Tate Gallery or the National Gallery" adding "I do strive to be taken seriously. It would be nice to get that sort of recognition."  He had recently learned that he would be taught as part of the GCSE art curriculum in Wales and he described the possibility of himself being mentioned in the same lesson as his hero Andy Warhol as "mind-blowing". Wyburn has also been included on the website for Ripley's Believe It or Not! franchise.

Wyburn is also known for viral Facebook videos such as Eminem created with spaghetti which received over 15 million views, after it was posted by LADbible and Ruby Rose shared her artwork created using pizza.

2015–2018
In November 2015 his book Not That Kind of Art, featuring 80 of his works, was published by Candy Jar. In December 2015 Wyburn created portraits of Francis Rossi and Rick Parfitt, from the rock group Status Quo, out of matchsticks, inspired by their 1969 song "Pictures of Matchstick Men". He also created images of Star Wars characters from food products, including lead characters Rey (Daisy Ridley) made from tomato puree and Finn (John Boyega) made from tikka paste.

Wyburn once again received attention on social media in January 2016 after creating a viral video of an 8 ft portrait of Justin Bieber entirely with lipstick, by kissing the canvas. In March 2016 Wyburn gave a talk and made live toast art at a TED (conference) alongside Procter & Gamble in Geneva, Switzerland. To celebrate the 40th year of The Prince's Trust, Wyburn collaborated with the charity to make a portrait of its ambassador Paloma Faith using thousands of images of people involved with the trust. The portrait was then projected on to some of the UK's landmark buildings, including Liverpool's Royal Liver Building and City Hall in London, Glasgow and Cardiff. A similar portrait of HRH Prince Charles was also commissioned and presented to him at Buckingham Palace by Dame Joan Collins. July 2016 marked the 20th anniversary of the Spice Girls, to celebrate this Wyburn created portraits of the 5 members Victoria Beckham, Emma Bunton, Mel B, Melanie C & Geri Halliwell using mediums inspired by their personas which included Caviar, Baby Powder & Ground Ginger Spice. Melanie C later received a drawing from Wyburn and branded him "Absolutely amazing!"

In August 2016, to celebrate the 30th anniversary of the Techniquest science museum, Wyburn created a portrait of scientist Albert Einstein using thousands of Smarties. He also painted a portrait of actor Gene Wilder, using chocolate, as a tribute to the late comic actor. To raise awareness of World AIDS Day on Dec 1st 2016, Wyburn created a red glitter portrait of singer & Queen icon, Freddie Mercury, who died of the disease in 1991.

Throughout March and April 2017, the Welsh language channel S4C, aired 7 consecutive art segments featuring 7 unique artworks being created by Wyburn. These included a painting of Gareth Bale with his feet, Sam Warburton with mud, Zoella with glitter and Johnny Depp as Captain Jack Sparrow created using sand and seaweed on Barry Island beachfront.

In May 2017, Wyburn created a celebratory image of Skepta for the British music company The Famous Company by using images of unsigned artists from around the world.

Wyburn received further national television coverage in July 2017 when he appeared on the ITV magazine show This Morning. He was interviewed by presenters Holly Willoughby and Phillip Schofield, who were given an artwork created using lipstick with kisses from his lips. Wyburn's celebrity admirers continued to grow as he presented work to the likes of Jennifer Saunders, TOWIE star Gemma Collins, Steps and Taylor Momsen.

In November 2017 Wyburn painted a picture of Jesus using a sausage roll and ketchup, in response to an advertisement for Greggs which showed a sausage roll in place of the holy infant on their advent calendars.

On New Year's Eve 2017, ITV aired a panel show hosted by Fern Britton titled A Right Royal Quiz which featured a cameo appearance from Wyburn, showcasing some of his royal portraits including a new artwork of The Queen using pizza. This was shortly followed by a widely successful ad campaign by Dr Beckmann, a cleaning product company which commissioned the artist to use its award-winning carpet stain remover, to make a  image of newly engaged Prince Harry and Meghan Markle by removing stains from a dirty carpet.

In March 2018 Wyburn created an image of the Mona Lisa in snow at Roath Park in Cardiff, alongside portraits of Jon Snow & Idina Menzel which were featured as a global Twitter ‘moment’.
In April 2018 Wyburn performed live art at Wales Comic Con weekend where he created several portraits of the special guests, including actor Andrew Scott.

In July 2018 Wyburn created a portrait of Welsh politician Aneurin Bevan, on the moors near the highest village in Wales, Trefil, during the 70th anniversary week of the National Health Service. The artwork, which took eight and a half hours to complete, was made entirely out of local materials, including 374 kg of garden soil and 74 kg of white stone dust. It is Wyburn's largest piece to date.

Autumn 2018 saw Wyburn team up with home improvement store B&Q to recreate a  replica of the Mona Lisa using fallen autumn leaves and a Bosch leaf blower. The latest celebrities in 2018 to praise Wyburn's work include Melanie B and Mariah Carey who tweeted saying she "loves this" in reply to his portrait of her.

Recent work

In early 2019 Wyburn created artwork for Lisa Riley, for Boyzone and for Dame Joan Collins at her show at the London Palladium. Wyburn has since been commissioned for Mariah Carey's birthday present using silver glitter, and was then invited to meet her at the Royal Albert Hall as a thank you. To mark Saint David's Day 2019, Wyburn created a large scale depiction of the Welsh patron saint, using garden bark and 1,000 daffodils, at the site of St Davids Bishops Palace. In May 2019 he presented a golden portrait of Dame Shirley Bassey to the singer, created on behalf of the charity Noah's Ark of which she is patron, on the day she was given Freedom of the City by Cardiff City Council. Wyburn then went on to present Catherine Zeta-Jones with artworks when she was awarded freedom of Swansea in July 2019.

2020 has seen Wyburn present artwork using lipstick to Caitlyn Jenner, using mealworms to Roman Kemp (after his stint in TV show I'm a Celebrity... and also to create Steps singer Ian "H" Watkins, alongside his Dancing on Ice same-sex partner Matt Evers, painted into an ice rink. The comedy panel show 8 Out of 10 Cats Does Countdown featured Wyburn’s work when host Jimmy Carr pretended to assemble a portrait of himself painted with Marmite on toast. Following Wyburn's portrait of Aneurin Bevan in 2018, Nathan created a digital collage of 200 NHS workers as a tribute to 'key workers' during the COVID-19 pandemic, inspired by the Clap for our Carers movement. The pandemic inspired artwork was featured on several newspaper front covers in Wales, including The Western Mail and South Wales Echo. Wyburn also featured on shows such as This Morning and American talk show Live With Kelly and Ryan to talk about the piece, and how to stay creative during the COVID-19 lockdown.
Channel 4 featured Wyburn on their new quarantine inspired Grayson’s Art Club TV show, presented by artist Grayson Perry, where he created a portrait using noodles and soy sauce.

In May 2020 Wyburn partnered up with Nutella & Smeg Australia for a campaign titled “Stay toasty with Nutella”. The project attracted media attention in Australia and he made an appearance on network breakfast television, The TODAY show to unveil a toast portrait of Karl Stefanovic. In June 2020, Wyburn created a 18-metre soil portrait of Tom Jones for his 80th birthday in the grounds of Cardiff Castle.

In August 2020 Wyburn unveiled a portrait of friend Gareth Thomas at Cardiff Royal Infirmary Sexual Health department, alongside Gareth himself. The artwork was created using red fingerprints, to symbolise blood and identity, with aims of erasing the stigma around HIV. Gareth said “a place that for me was once shrouded with shame, now hangs my portrait with pride, and I hope it makes a difference.”

Wyburn’s work continues to gain praise from other notable subjects such as Christina Aguilera, Schitt’s Creek star and creator Daniel Levy and footballer Marcus Rashford.

In October 2020 Wyburn received praise from American Horror Story and Ratched actress Sarah Paulson and writer Ryan Murphy for his artwork of Nurse Ratched from their Netflix hit series, which he created using nurses gowns, face masks and gloves, as well as wearing full nurse costumes to eventually blend into the artwork itself. They branded Nathan “A STAR.” 
Ahead of the presidential election Wyburn produced a viral social media video, depicting him creating the portrait of candidate Joe Biden using a self inking stamp which read ‘VOTE’. He also paid tribute to James Bond actor Sir Sean Connery on the day of his passing, by painting him with ‘Gold Finger’ paint.

Advocacy and personal life
Wyburn is gay and is an ambassador and spokesperson for several anti-bullying charities and campaigns. He is also a supporting partner of Pride Cymru acting as their youth ambassador. When asked, in a 2014 interview with eqview.com, whether he saw his LGBT perspective as playing an important/any role in his art, he replied: "I see it playing a huge role in my life in general. I don’t think I’d be half as strong minded or determined if I hadn't had to go through my teenage years facing what difficulties I did – bullying etc. I feel proud enough to create pieces of work that are supportive of the LGBT community such as Obama painted on the pride flag – and stand on stage at Pride events and show people it gets better." In 2012 Wyburn created a portrait of the newly re-elected President Barack Obama, painted on a pride rainbow flag, inspired by Obama's support for same-sex marriage.

In October 2015 Wyburn took part in YouTube's first live 12-hour Stand Up to Cancer event, making coffee portraits of YouTube favourites Joe Sugg and Caspar Lee. The day raised over £120,000. Following the first series success, in May 2016 Wyburn modelled for photographer Thomas Knights, as part of his Red Hot 2 campaign. The exhibition and book is aimed at celebrating and rebranding the stereotype of red heads.

In August 2016 it was revealed that Wyburn was placed at number 10 in "The Pinc List 2016", a list of the 40 most influential LGBT people in Wales. In December 2018 Wyburn was part of a team of people who presented a Christmas-themed drag show at St Andrews United Reformed Church, Roath, to continue fundraising for the building's vital repairs, ultimately preventing its closure. The event not just saved the building, but built further bridges between the church and the LGBTQ+ community.
In September 2020 it was announced that Torchwood and Keeping Faith actress Eve Myles, was writing and going to be starring in a movie based on the story of the LGBT community coming to the aid of the church. Empty Room and Fulwell 73 are the companies behind the project. The movie has a working title of “Dragged To Church” just like the original event and will be based around several pivotal characters, including Nathan. It's set for a 2021 cinema release.

In August 2019, Wyburn was named as one of the top 5 Welsh LGBTQ people by Style of the City magazine, alongside the likes of Gareth Thomas and Russell T Davies. In September 2019, BBC Crimewatch aired an interview with Nathan, and several other LGBTQ+ participants about homophobia and hate crime in Wales.

To mark World Mental Health Day, on 10 October 2019, Wyburn shared a candid post about his mental health problems and how important it is to talk about them. He also became one of the first patrons for the Cardiff & Vale Health charity, as well as patron for Welsh Hearts, Autism Puzzles Cymru and Kinetic School of Performing Arts. In 2020, Wyburn was placed 79th on the 'Most Influential Redhead Men' list by Red Hot 100.

Books

References

External links 
 Official website
 Wales Online article
 freelibrary.com article
 The Mirror article

1989 births
Living people
People from Ebbw Vale
Alumni of Cardiff School of Art and Design
Welsh LGBT painters
Welsh portrait painters
Britain's Got Talent contestants